Joseph Albert Bélanger (October 22, 1922 - July 1, 2005) was an Ontario dairy farmer and political figure. He represented Prescott and Russell in the Legislative Assembly of Ontario from 1967 to 1981 as a Progressive Conservative member.

He was born in Hammond, Ontario, the son of Sylvio Bélanger. In 1942, he married Suzanne Balamie. He was a cheese producer and served as director of the Ontario Dairy Producers Council. Bélanger served as deputy government whip in 1976. He lived in Sarsfield and was a member of the Knights of Columbus.

References 

 Canadian Parliamentary Guide, 1977, PG Normandin

External links 
Member's parliamentary history for the Legislative Assembly of Ontario

1922 births
Progressive Conservative Party of Ontario MPPs
Franco-Ontarian people
People from Clarence-Rockland
2005 deaths